Microdes asystata is a moth in the family Geometridae. It is found in Australia (including New South Wales, the type location).

References

Moths described in 1922
Eupitheciini